Misick is a surname. Notable people with the surname include:

Ariel Misick (born 1951), Turks and Caicos Islands politician
Emmanuel Misick, Turks and Caicos Islands politician
Michael Misick (born 1966), Premier of the Turks and Caicos Islands
Washington Misick (born 1950), Premier of the Turks and Caicos Islands

See also
Gladys Carlyon De Courcy Misick Morrell (1888–1969), Bermudian suffragette leader
Missick